Nangong Shi may refer to:

Nangong City, city in Xingtai, Hebei, China
Nangong Kuo (disambiguation) (南宫适), often mispronounced as Nangong Shi.